Michael Zimbalist is an American filmmaker. He is a three-time Emmy Award and a Peabody Awards winner.

Life and career
Michael Zimbalist was born in Northampton, Massachusetts. He graduated from Wesleyan University and trained as an actor at the New York University Tisch School of the Arts. He is a director, producer, and writer whose films have been broadcast on HBO, Netflix, Apple, Fox, Showtime, PBS, ESPN and the BBC, as well as theatrically distributed worldwide. He has also produced and directed commercial work for RealTruck, Gatorade, Pepsi, Verizon, and the NFL.

The Two Escobars 
In 2010, Michael wrote, directed and produced The Two Escobars with his brother  Jeff Zimbalist. The film was an official selection at the Cannes Film Festival, the Tribeca Film Festival, the Los Angeles Film Festival, the IDFA International Film Festival, and was released by Disney / ESPN Films.
Sports Illustrated named the film the Documentary of the Year alongside The Tillman Story.  The New York Post and Vulture ranked it as the best of the 150 films in the Academy Award-winning and Emmy Award-winning 30 for 30 series.

Youngstown Boys and 30 for 30 
Between 2010 and 2014, Michael produced four entries in the 30 for 30 series, including Arnold's Blueprint with Arnold Schwarzenegger, The Myth of Garrincha, and Youngstown Boys, about Maurice Clarett and Jim Tressel. Youngstown Boys, which Michael also co-wrote and directed, won the Sports Emmy Award in 2014.

Pelé and Loving Pablo 
In 2016, Michael co-wrote and directed Pelé: Birth of a Legend, a scripted feature film about the soccer legend for Imagine Entertainment with Academy Award winner Brian Grazer producing and an original score from Academy Award winner A. R. Rahman. The film premiered premiered at the Tribeca Film Festival and was released theatrically worldwide. In 2017, Michael wrote the story for and associate produced Loving Pablo, starring Javier Bardem and Penelope Cruz, which premiered at the Venice International Film Festival and the Toronto International Film Festival and was released by Universal Studios.

Filmography

Awards and nominations

References

External links
 

Living people
American film directors
People from Northampton, Massachusetts
1980 births